Aavesham is a 1979 Indian Malayalam film,  directed by Vijayanand. The film stars Jayan, Sheela, M. N. Nambiar, Ceylon Manohar and Jayamalini in the lead roles. The film has musical score by A. T. Ummer. The movie was rich with action scenes and Jayan played double role.

Cast
Jayan as Gopi/Ravi (Double Role)
Sheela as Susheela
Ceylon Manohar
Jayamalini as Rathi
K. P. Ummer as Raghavan
Kunchan
M. N. Nambiar as Shekhar
P. K. Abraham as Ammavan
 Mala Aravindan as Thirumeni
Meena
 Cochin Haneefa
 T. P. Madhavan
 Thodupuzha Radhakrishnan as Thankappan
 N. Govindankutty as Moopan
 C.I.D Shakunthala
 Master Kabeer

Soundtrack
The music was composed by A. T. Ummer and the lyrics were written by Bichu Thirumala.

References

External links
 

1979 films
1970s Malayalam-language films
Films scored by A. T. Ummer